The Cape Fear Thunder is a football team in the Women's Spring Football League (WSFL) based in Fayetteville, North Carolina. Home games are played at John P. Daskyll Stadium on the campus of Reid Ross High School.

The Thunder began in 2003 as the Fayetteville Thunder in the Women's Football League.  After a one-season hiatus, the team returned to action as the Cape Fear Thunder.  In 2005 and 2006, the Thunder played in the Women's Professional Football League.

From 2007 to 2009, the Thunder competed in the Independent Women's Football League.  2011 saw the team moving to a new women's football league, the Women's Spring Football League.  The Cape Fear Thunder captured the WSFL's 2011 8's Division National Championship after a 4-2-1 record for the season.  In 2014, the Cape Fear Thunder defeated the West Virginia Wildfire 34–26 to capture their second WSFL 8s division championship.

In 2016, the Thunder moved to the Ladies American Football League.

Season-By-Season 

|-
| colspan="6" align="center" | Fayetteville Thunder (WFL)
|-
|2003 || 3 || 3 || 0 || 2nd League || --
|-
| colspan="6" align="center" | Cape Fear Thunder (WPFL)
|-
|2005 || 2 || 5 || 0 || 4th National East || --
|-
|2006 || 1 || 1 || 0 || X-Team || --
|-
| colspan="6" align="center" | Cape Fear Thunder (IWFL)
|-
|2007 || 1 || 7 || 0 || 3rd Eastern Mid-Atlantic || --
|-
|2008 || 2 || 6 || 0 || 3rd Southern South Atlantic || --
|-
|2009 || 1 || 7 || 0 || 19th League || --
|-
| colspan="6" align="center" | Cape Fear Thunder (WSFL)
|-
|2011 || 4 || 2 || 1 || 1st League || Declared W8FL Champions (based on regular season record)
|-
|2012 || 3 || 8 || 0 || 2nd Eastern || --
|-
|2013 || 1 || 4 || 0 || 3rd League || --
|-
|2014 || 3 || 5 || 0 || 4th League || Won League Semifinal (Nashville)Won W8FL Championship (West Virginia)
|-
|2015 || 2 || 2 || 0 || 2nd League || Lost WSFL Championship (New York)
|-
| colspan="6" align="center" | Cape Fear Thunder (LAFL)
|-
|2016 || 1 || 4 || 0 || 4th League || --
|-
|Totals || 24 || 54 || 1
|colspan="2"|

2012 Season Schedule

References

 Cape Fear Thunder

Women's Professional Football League teams
Independent Women's Football League
Sports in Fayetteville, North Carolina
American football teams established in 2005
2005 establishments in North Carolina
Women's sports in North Carolina